The Pantanal is a natural region encompassing the world's largest tropical wetland area, and the world's largest flooded grasslands. It is located mostly within the Brazilian state of Mato Grosso do Sul, but it extends into Mato Grosso and portions of Bolivia and Paraguay. Various subregional ecosystems exist, each with distinct hydrological, geological and ecological characteristics; up to 12 of them have been defined.

Roughly 80% of the Pantanal floodplains are submerged during the rainy seasons, nurturing a biologically diverse collection of aquatic plants and helping to support a dense array of animal species.

Etymology 
The name "Pantanal" comes from the Portuguese word pântano that means "big wetland", "big bog", "big swamp", "big quagmire" or "big marsh" plus the suffix -al, that means "abundance, agglomeration, collection"; By comparison, the Brazilian highlands are locally referred to as the planalto, that means "plateau" or, literally, "high plain".

Geography and geology 
The formation is a result of the large, concave pre-Andean depression of the earth's crust, related to the Andean orogeny of the Tertiary. It constitutes an enormous internal river delta, in which several rivers flowing from the surrounding plateau merge, depositing their sediments and erosion residues, which have been filling, throughout the years, the large depression area of the Pantanal.

The Pantanal is bounded by the Chiquitano dry forests to the west and northwest, by the Arid Chaco dry forests to the southwest, and the Humid Chaco to the south. The Cerrado savannas lie to the north, east and southeast. Its wettest month is January (with an average of ) and its driest is June (with an average of ).

Hydrodynamics 

Floodplain ecosystems such as the Pantanal are defined by their seasonal inundation and desiccation. They shift between phases of standing water and phases of dry soil, when the water table can be well below the root region. Soils range from high levels of sand in higher areas to higher amounts of clay and silt in riverine areas.

Annual average precipitation ranged from 920 to 1,540 mm in the years 1968-2000. In the Paraguay River portion of the Pantanal, water levels rise between two meters to five meters seasonally; water fluctuations in other parts of the Pantanal are less than this. Flood waters tend to flow slowly ( per second) due to the low gradients and high resistance offered by the dense vegetation.

When rising river waters first contact previously dry soil, the waters become oxygen-depleted, rendering the water environs anoxic. Many natural fish kills can occur if there are no oxygenated water refuges available. The reason for this remains speculative: it may be due to the growth of toxin-producing bacteria in the deoxygenated water rather than as a direct result of lack of oxygen.

Flora 

The vegetation of the Pantanal, often referred to as the "Pantanal complex", is a mixture of plant communities typical of a variety of surrounding biome regions: these include moist tropical Amazonian rainforest plants, semiarid woodland plants typical of northeast Brazil, Brazilian cerrado savanna plants and plants of the Chaco savannas of Bolivia and Paraguay. Forests usually occur at higher altitudes of the region, while grasslands cover the seasonally inundated areas. The key limiting factors for growth are inundation and, even more importantly, water-stress during the dry season.

According to Embrapa, approximately 2,000 different plants have been identified in the Pantanal biome and classified according to their potential, with some presenting significant medicinal promise.

Fauna 
The Pantanal ecosystem is home to some 463 species of birds, 269 species of fishes, more than 236 species of mammals, 141 species of reptiles and amphibians, and over 9,000 subspecies of invertebrates.

The apple snail is a keystone species in Pantanal's ecosystem. When the wetlands are flooded once a year, the grass and other plants will eventually die and start to decay. During this process, decomposing microbes deplete the shallow water of all oxygen, suffocating larger decomposers. Unlike other decomposing animals, the apple snails have both gills and lungs, making it possible for them to thrive in anoxic waters where they recycle the nutrients. To get oxygen, they extend a long snorkel to the water surface, pumping air into their lungs. This ability allows them to consume all the dead plant matter and turn it into nutritious fertilizer available for the plants in the area. The snails themselves are also food for a variety of animals.

Among the rarest animals to inhabit the wetland of the Pantanal are the marsh deer (Blastocerus dichotomus) and the giant river otter (Pteronura brasiliensis). Parts of the Pantanal are also home to the following endangered or threatened species: the hyacinth macaw (Anodorhyncus hyacinthinus) (a bird endangered due to smuggling), the crowned solitary eagle (Buteogallus coronatus), the maned wolf (Chrysocyon brachyurus), the bush dog (Speothos venaticus), the South American tapir (Tapirus terrestris) and the giant anteater (Myrmecophaga tridactyla). Common species in the Pantanal include the capybara (Hydrochoerus hydrochaeris), Ocelot (Leopardus pardalis) and the yacare caiman (Caiman yacare). According to 1996 data, there were 10 million caimans in the Pantanal, making it the highest concentration of crocodilians in the World. 

There are thirteen species of herons and egrets, six species of ibises and spoonbills, and five species of kingfishers that use the Pantanal as a breeding and feeding ground. There are nineteen species of parrots documented in the Pantanal, including five species of macaws. Some migratory birds include the American golden plover, Peregrine falcon, and the Bobolink.

Most fish are detritivores, primarily ingesting fine particles from sediments and plant surfaces. This is characteristic of fish living in South American flood-plains in general. Fish migration between river channels and flood-plain regions occurs seasonally. These fish have many adaptations that allow them to survive in the oxygen-depleted flood-plain waters.

In addition to the caiman, some of the reptiles that inhabit the Pantanal are the yellow anaconda (Eunectes notaeus), the gold tegu (Tupinambis teguixin), the red-footed tortoise (Geochelone carbonaria) and the green iguana (Iguana iguana).

Gallery

Threats 
The Pantanal region includes essential sanctuaries for migratory birds, critical nursery grounds for aquatic life, and refuges for such creatures as the yacare caiman, deer, and Pantanal jaguar. It is important to note that most species are not under threat due to the low deforestation rates (less than 17%) of native vegetation now in the area due to new regulations.

Some of the causes which threaten the Pantanal ecosystems are:

Fishing
Commercial fishing is focused on only a few species and is probably not sustainable. National and international sport fishing in the Paraguay river and its tributaries are the main focus for fishing activities. Local fishing communities have been under close watch by environmentalists as well.
Cattle-ranching:
Approximately 99% of the land in the Pantanal is privately owned for the purpose of agriculture and ranching, even though there are some regulations on available land based on the extent of flooding during each wet season.
There are 2500 fazendas in the region and up to eight million cattle.
Erosion and sedimentation caused by this activity alter the soil and hydrological characteristics of Pantanal flood-plain ecosystems; consequently, native species are threatened by the change in ecosystem variables.
Hunting, poaching, and smuggling of endangered species: Reptile, wild cat and parrot species are particularly at risk from the smuggling industry due to their high value on the black market.
Uncontrolled tourism and overuse of natural resources
Deforestation
Establishment of logging companies during political turmoils in the region resulted in peak deforestation rates between 1978-1989. Many livelihoods were dependent on harvesting rubber trees as new waves of migrants arrived, resulting in what is now there today.
Silt run-off from deforested highlands alters soil hydrology and is a significant threat to the Pantanal.
Pollution from gold mining operations and agro-industry
The Pantanal is a natural water treatment system as it removes chemicals, including pollutants, from water. Overpollution from industrial development (especially gold mining) can harm native flora and fauna.
However, water quality in the Pantanal was not significantly degraded as of 2002.
Pollution from sewage systems and pesticides
Movement to large-scale agriculture of food crops, mainly soy-beans, has adopted the use of large quantities of chemical pesticides and fertilizers which leach into the soil or run-off to the flood plains of the Pantanal.
Forest Fires : In late 2020, a quarter of the wetland was destroyed by an unprecedented fire occurred due to climate change. An area estimated of about 7681 square miles has been razed by the fire, killing millions of vertrebrates. Experts say 2020 is the most active year on record for wildfires. Until November 2020, Brazil's National Institute of Space Research (INPE) had detected more than 21,200 fires in the Pantanal biome, a figure that is already 69% higher than the full-year record from 2005, when INPE recorded roughly 12,500 fires. There were 8,106 fires in September 2020 alone—more than four times the historic average for the month.
Climate change
.Current predictive climate models indicate a progressive increase in the frequency of extreme events (e.g., extreme rainfalls and extended droughts). These events could affect the Pantanal´s ecosystem functioning, amplifying and worsening human modifications of hydrological and environmental conditions in the basin.

Protected areas 

A portion of the Pantanal in Brazil has been protected as the Pantanal Matogrossense National Park. This  park, established in September 1981, is located in the municipality of Poconé in the State of Mato Grosso, between the mouths of the Baía de São Marcos and the Gurupi Rivers. The park was designated a Ramsar Site of International Importance under the Ramsar Convention on May 24, 1993.

It is located in the north-eastern portion, known as "Poconé" Pantanal, not far from the Pantanal National Park. It is a mix of permanent rivers, seasonal streams, permanent and seasonal floodplain freshwater lakes, shrub-dominated wetlands and seasonally flooded forests, all dedicated to nature preservation, and was designated a Ramsar Site of International Importance under the Ramsar Convention.

Otuquis National Park and Integrated Management Natural Area is a national park of Bolivia in the Pantanal. The entrance to Otuquis National park is through the town of Puerto Suarez.

Main cities
Brasil
Miranda, Mato Grosso do Sul
Aquidauana, Mato Grosso do Sul
Barão de Melgaço, Mato Grosso
Bodoquena, Mato Grosso do Sul 
Bonito, Mato Grosso do Sul
Cáceres, Mato Grosso
Corumbá, Mato Grosso do Sul
Coxim, Mato Grosso do Sul
Ladário, Mato Grosso do Sul
Poconé, Mato Grosso
Bolivia
Puerto Quijarro, Santa Cruz
Puerto Suárez, Santa Cruz
Paraguay
Bahía Negra, Alto Paraguay
Fuerte Olimpo, Alto Paraguay

In fiction 
Pantanal appears as a natural wonder in the strategy game Civilization VI.
John Grisham's novel The Testament largely takes place in the Pantanal.
Pantanal is the title of a Brazilian-produced telenovela whose setting is the Brazilian Pantanal.
The Jack McKinney Robotech novel Before the Invid Storm makes reference to former soldiers of the Army of the Southern Cross called the Pantanal Brigade by the character Major Alice Harper Argus.
The Twilight Saga: The Amazon Coven: "The Amazon coven consists of three sisters, Kachiri, Zafrina, and Senna, all natives of the Pantanal wetlands."
Pantanal makes an appearance in Tom Clancy's Ghost Recon: Wildlands as a region called Caimanes.

See also 

Wildlife of Brazil
Iberá Wetlands

References

Bibliography

External links 

Pantanal maps and tourist information
Pantanal Nature. Information on wildlife in Pantanal.
Patanal bird checklist

 
Flooded grasslands and savannas
Ecoregions of Bolivia
Ecoregions of Brazil
Ecoregions of Paraguay
Ecoregions of South America
La Plata basin
Floodplains of South America
Natural regions of South America
Swamps of South America
Grasslands of Bolivia
Grasslands of Brazil
Grasslands of Paraguay
Geography of Mato Grosso do Sul
Landforms of Mato Grosso do Sul
Wetlands of Brazil
Wetlands of Bolivia
Wetlands of Paraguay
Regions of Brazil
Regions of South America
Physiographic provinces
Ramsar sites in Brazil
Ramsar sites in Bolivia
Ramsar sites in Paraguay
Biosphere reserves of Brazil
World Heritage Sites in Brazil